Glandas Marie Erick Toussaint (born 19 May 1965 in Grande Savane) is a Haitian clergyman and bishop for the Roman Catholic Diocese of Jacmel. He was ordained in 1994. He was appointed Auxiliary Bishop of Port-au-Prince, Haiti, and Titular Bishop of Senez in 2011, and then Bishop of Jacmel in Haiti in 2018.

References 

Haitian Roman Catholic bishops
1965 births
Living people
Roman Catholic bishops of Jacmel
Roman Catholic bishops of Port-au-Prince